JaJuan Latroy Dawson (November 5, 1977 – July 12, 2015) was a  wide receiver in the NFL from 2000 to 2002. He played for the Cleveland Browns and Houston Texans.  He was drafted by the Browns in the third round of the 2000 NFL Draft with the 79th overall pick.

He was a 1995 graduate of H.L. Bourgeois High School in Gray, Louisiana. He played collegiately at Tulane University, alongside future NFL quarterbacks Shaun King and Patrick Ramsey.  He also played in an offensive system under then OC Rich Rodriguez in 1997 and 1998.

Dawson was reported to have fallen overboard  while on a boating trip with family on July 12, 2015. Reports surfaced that he drowned in Lavon Lake, Texas, and his body was recovered on July 14. Dawson was not wearing a lifejacket.

College statistics
1996: 18 catches for 211 yards and 1 touchdown.
1997: 52 catches for 839 yards and 10 touchdowns.
1998: 74 catches for 1030 yards and 12 touchdowns.
1999: 96 catches for 1051 yards and 8 touchdowns.  1 carry for 3 yards.  14 kick returns for 328 yards.

In 2001, he had 22 catches for 281 yards and 1 touchdown while playing for the Cleveland Browns.  He joined the Houston Texans in 2002 and had 21 catches for 286 yards.

References 

1977 births
2015 deaths
Cleveland Browns players
Houston Texans players
Indianapolis Colts players
Tulane Green Wave football players
American football wide receivers
Accidental deaths in Texas
Deaths by drowning in the United States
H. L. Bourgeois High School alumni